The 1903 Ohio State Buckeyes football team was an American football team that represented Ohio State University during the 1903 college football season. The Buckeyes compiled an 8–3 record and outscored their opponents by a combined total of 265 to 87 in their second season under head coach Perry Hale.

Schedule

References

Ohio State
Ohio State Buckeyes football seasons
Ohio State Buckeyes football